Yau Kom Tau is a geographical feature at the north shore of Tsing Yi Island in Hong Kong. It originally was a flat headland formed by a small hill with a bay, Ngau Kok Wan, on its east and a valley and a swamp on its west. Its natural shoreline was reclaimed for the relocation of shipyards from Cheung Sha Wan. There are only two roads, Tam Kon Shan Road and Tsing Yi North Coastal Road on the headland.

References 

Places in Hong Kong
Tsing Yi